Allahdino Sand railway station is located in Allahdino Sand village, Matyari district, Sindh province, Pakistan.

See also
 List of railway stations in Pakistan
 Pakistan Railways
 Allah Dino Sand

References

Railway stations in Matiari District
Railway stations on Karachi–Peshawar Line (ML 1)